This is a List of National Historic Landmarks in Arizona. There are 47 National Historic Landmarks (NHLs) in Arizona, counting Hoover Dam that spans from Nevada and is listed in Nevada by the National Park Service (NPS), and Yuma Crossing and Associated Sites, which is listed by the NPS in Arizona, and overlaps into California. The first designated was San Xavier del Bac Mission, in October, 1960. The most recently designated is the Klagetoh (Leegito) Chapter House in January 2021.

Current NHLs

|}

Former listing

See also

 National Register of Historic Places listings in Arizona
 List of National Historic Landmarks by state
 List of historic properties in Phoenix, Arizona
 List of historic properties in Glendale, Arizona

Notes

External links 
 
 National Historic Landmarks Program, at National Park Service

 
National Historic Landmark
National Historic Landmark
Arizona
National Historic Landmark
Landmarks in Arizona